Only Revolutions is the fifth studio album by Scottish alternative rock band Biffy Clyro, released 9 November 2009 on 14th Floor Records. As with its predecessor, Puzzle, the album was produced by Garth Richardson. Upon release, Only Revolutions was a critical and commercial success. The album entered at  8 on the UK Album Chart and was then certified gold by the BPI shortly afterwards. It was certified platinum by the BPI in June 2010 for shipments of 300,000 copies in the UK, making it the band's largest selling album. In September 2010, the album achieved a new peak position of No. 3. It was the 26th biggest selling album of 2010 in the UK with sales of 377,900. It was nominated for the 2010 Mercury Prize, which is awarded annually for the best album in the UK or Ireland, and Rock Sound declared it third in its list of the 75 best albums of 2009.

Overview

In an interview with NME in September 2008, lead singer Simon Neil confirmed that work had begun on a followup to Puzzle, the new material containing some of the band's 'heaviest riffs to date,' while also introducing keyboards, suggesting some experimentation. The first preview of the album came the following November, the band debuting a new song 'God & Satan' while playing an acoustic gig at London's Union Chapel. In a March 2009 Kerrang! magazine article, it was stated that they planned to enter the studio and begin recording in April 2009. The same Kerrang! article revealed a working title for the upcoming album - "Boom, Blast and Ruin". Although this title was eventually scrapped, it was revealed that a song of the same name would appear on the album.

The final title for the album was officially announced as Only Revolutions after Mark Z. Danielewski's 2006 novel.
Bassist James Johnston notes:

"That Golden Rule" was confirmed as the second single from the album, after receiving its first play from an ecstatic Zane Lowe during his Radio 1 show on 8 July. The single was released on 23 August 2009.

It was subsequently confirmed that the album would also include the band's 2008 hit single "Mountains," which had not previously been included on any of the band's studio albums (and had at the time of its release been considered a "non-album single").

Kerrang! magazine ran an interview in the 25 August edition informing the album would have 12 tracks and that David Campbell was providing orchestrations to six of those tracks. The article also validated the rumours that Josh Homme would make a guest appearance on the album, contributing a guitar solo to the track "Bubbles". "The Captain" received its first play during Zane Lowe's Radio 1 show on 8 September and it was then confirmed that the single would be released on 26 October.

The band confirmed on 26 November 2009 through their website that "Many of Horror" would be the fourth single and would be released on 18 January 2010. It had been Fearne Cotton's record of the week on her Radio 1 weekday show.

The next single to be released was "Bubbles" on 3 May. The song reached a peak position of No. 34 on the UK Singles Chart, making it the fifth consecutive single to reach the top forty.

On 23 August the same year, the band released "God & Satan" as their next single. Like "Many of Horror", God & Satan received a single mix and further B-sides. On the same day, the band released a compilation album of all B-sides released during Only Revolutions called Lonely Revolutions, much akin to Missing Pieces. Originally, the album was released as a limited pressing of 300 copies on 12' vinyl but later released a limited number of 1000 CDs.

Many of Horror, renamed as 'When We Collide', was chosen as The X Factor finalists song for Matt Cardle, and was released on 13 December with the aim of becoming the UK's Christmas Number 1 record for 2010.

Artwork
The sleeve's designer Storm Thorgerson said: "In thinking that the music was strong-minded yet lyrical persuaded us to think of material flapping in the wind like flags – the flags of a revolution. Not little flags or small bits of fabric, but enormous flags the size of a modest office block, which we affixed to a scaffold tower on the top of a hill on a windy day. The sound of the undulating material was affecting, let alone the bizarre shapes. The actual cover used red and blue flags to represent the sexes."

The picture is indebted to another of Thorgerson's works: the sleeve and video for Pink Floyd's "High Hopes".

Critical reception

Only Revolutions was met with positive reviews; Metacritic reports an aggregated score of 76, based on eight professional reviews.

Nick Annan of Clash magazine was favourable in his review and awarded a score of 7/10. He summarised; "QOTSA's Josh Homme contributes a guitar solo on 'Bubbles' and while Top five hit 'Mountains' is still the best example here of the band in full majestic flow, there are plenty of big chorus to be enjoyed elsewhere here. Contrary to the album's title, for Biffy Clyro evolution proves more useful than revolution".
Drowned in Sound writer Thom Gibbs praised the bands earnestness, despite describing the sound as more commercially accessible; "Biffy Clyro’s Simon Neil is emphatically unbothered about offending the anti-earnest on his band’s fifth album. Only Revolutions is a massive, bold and ambitious record, primed for radio but loaded with the unshakeable seriousness and belief that has run through Biffy’s career". He was less favourable towards the lyrics, particularly in slower songs such as 'God & Satan' and 'Many of Horror', but ultimately awarded a score of 8/10. He added, "Grandeur suits Biffy Clyro, and their overblown songs manage to tug effectively on heartstrings despite their foibles. Their vibrant brand of ridiculousness is infinitely preferable to the mass emotional prescriptions of Snow Patrol or vapid truisms of Coldplay".
Matt Glass, journalist for Scottish publication The Fly, gave a positive review with a 4/5 star rating. He did say however, that the album wasn't completely cohesive throughout; "Each track is undoubtedly great, but, as an album, Only Revolutions sometimes struggles to flow through Biffy’s scatterbomb of styles". That was that the only criticism though as he summed up his review with, "With Only Revolutions, Biffy cast a magnifying glass over everything they showcased on Puzzle. The riffs get louder, the screams more pertinent and the orchestral onslaughts darker and more sinister. 'Mon the Biffy..."
Chris Reynolds of Gigwise also awarded the album a four star rating. He summarised, "Simply put Only Revolutions maintains predictability and unpredictability in equal measure. It’s a step forward, a step up and a genuinely brilliant rock album, bring on the amphitheatres".
The Guardian writer Sarah Boden, complimented the band for "confidently casting their net wider" than predecessor Puzzle. She went on to add that "Biffy Clyro have got this far without paying heed to populist tastes, so they needn't start now. Still, it's a woeful soul who can listen to Only Revolutions without feeling exhilarated and part of the gang".
NME gave a very positive review, awarding a score of 8/10. Jamie Fullerton wrote that the album "springs the band instantly level with the greatest rock acts in the world. The only thing that can stop them being recognised as such is the 2010 trend of UK guitar music being treated with contempt by the electro-pop-fixated mainstream".
Rock Sound were also highly favourable, scoring the album at 9/10. Tim Newbound wrote that, "Only Revolutions perfectly juxtaposes moods; beautifully serene songs such as 'God & Satan', 'Know Your Quarry' and 'Many of Horror', for example, provide an ebb and flow that balances delicacy with the balls-out aggression of 'Cloud of Stink' and the ace closer that is 'Whorses', a song in which they achieve a dark melodic sensibility that betters anything featured on one of Neil's favourite records, Weezer's Pinkerton".
Mark Edwards of The Sunday Times gave the album a four star review. He praised the record for holding a "highly listenable variant". He also wrote that, "On Only Revolutions they move things up a gear with a string of actual and potential hits ('That Golden Rule', 'Mountains' and the stadium-ready 'The Captain' have already charted; the Josh Homme-featuring 'Bubbles' surely will). But the rubbery oddness of 'Born on a Horse' reassures us that the band haven’t lost their quirky imagination".
 Further positive reviews came from British publications, Kerrang! and Q, who both rated the album at four stars. Q magazine also named the album one of the 50 best records of 2009 and the song "Bubbles" as no 2 in its top 50 downloads of November.

Accolades

Track listing

 "The Captain", "That Golden Rule", "Mountains", "Many of Horror", "Bubbles" & "God & Satan" were released as singles.
 An exclusive track by track video was available with the iTunes release of the album which consisted of a 15-minute video including all 3 members of the band commenting on each track.

Unreleased track
 "I'm Probably in Your Pocket" was originally set to be on "Only Revolutions" but it was cut from the album. Simon Neil disclosed in an interview with Ultimate Guitar that the band thought the song "wouldn’t have fitted on the record". The song was later put in the band's next studio album, Opposites, now titled "Pocket".

Editions
 A Standard CD
 A Limited Edition CD/DVD which includes an hour long DVD entitled 'Voice & Electrical Noises'. The DVD features exclusive footage of the band during their stay in LA whilst they were recording the album at Ocean Way Studios.
 A Special Box Set was released exclusively through the official website.  There were only 2000 made and it includes the CD/DVD edition of the album, Heavyweight 12" vinyl, "Somebody Help Me Play" - Play Along CD, Guitar Tab Poster, Pin Badges, Plectrum, A full orchestral score, Sticker Sheet, 12" art print signed by the legendary Storm Thorgerson & A piece of one of the actual flags from the album cover art.
 iTunes LP special edition reissue. Featuring all music videos, behind the scenes videos, 'Voice & Electrical Noises' documentary, lyrics and photographs.

Personnel
The following people contributed to Only Revolutions:

Biffy Clyro
 Simon Neil – lead vocals, guitars, piano, theremin ("Born on a Horse", "Shock Shock")
 James Johnston – vocals, bass guitar
 Ben Johnston – backing vocals, drums, percussion

Additional musicians
 Josh Homme - additional guitar ("Bubbles")
 Jamie Muhoberac - keyboards, programming
 Ben Kaplan - additional keyboards, programming

Production
 Garth Richardson – producer, additional editing
 Biffy Clyro - co-producer
 Ben Kaplan - recording, additional editing
 David Schiffman - recording
 Andy Wallace – mixing
 Howie Weinberg – mastering
 Nick Rowe - additional editing
 Wesley M.Seidman - assistant engineer
 Julia Sundström - general assistant

Orchestra
 David Campbell - strings, brass and woodwind arrangements, conductor
 Joel Derouin - violin
 Roberto Cani - violin
 Julian Hallmark - violin
 Tammy Hatwan - violin
 Gerardo Hilera - violin
 Natalie Leggett - violin
 Sid Page - violin
 Sara Parkins - violin
 Vladamir Polimatidi - violin
 Philip Vaiman - violin
 John Wittenberg - violin
 Ken Yerke - violin
 Liam Brennan - violin
 Steve Richards - cello
 Erika Duke - cello
 George Kim Scholes - cello
 Rudolph Stein - cello
 Rick Baptist - trumpet
 Wayne Bergeron - trumpet
 Alan Kaplan - trombone
 Steve Holtman - trombone
 Jonathan Sacdalan - bass clarinet
 Julie Feves - bass clarinet
 Joe Meyer - french horn
 Douglas Tornquist - tuba
 Christian Hughes - Chai Wallah
 Alex Orosa - Violin

Charts and certifications

Weekly charts

Year-end charts

Certifications

Release history
Only Revolutions was released in various countries in 2009.

References

External links
Review by C.B.Liddell in Metropolis

2009 albums
Biffy Clyro albums
Albums produced by Garth Richardson
Albums with cover art by Storm Thorgerson
Roadrunner Records albums